I. sinensis  may refer to:
 Inimicus sinensis, the spotted ghoul, Chinese stinger, spotted stingerfish or spotted stonefish, a venomous fish species
 Ixobrychus sinensis, the yellow bittern, a bird species breeding in tropical Asia from India, Pakistan, and Sri Lanka, east to Japan and Indonesia

See also
 Flora Sinensis